John Sheehan may refer to:

John Sheehan (journalist) (1812–1882), Irish writer and barrister
John Sheehan (New Zealand politician) (1844–1885), New Zealand politician
John Sheehan (Australian politician) (1916–1984), Labor member of the Parliament of Victoria
John C. Sheehan (1915–1992), American chemist
John Francis Sheehan (1910–1942), United States Navy sailor
John J. Sheehan (born 1940), United States Marine Corps general
Jack Sheehan (baseball) (1893–1987), American baseball player
Jack Sheehan (footballer) (1890–1933), Australian footballer
John Sheehan (actor) (1885–1952), American film and vaudeville actor
John C. Sheehan (?–1913), leader of Tammany Hall
John Sheehan (Liverpool politician) (1885–1972), Alderman and Lord Mayor of Liverpool

See also 
John Sheahan